Van Wesley Stephenson (November 4, 1953 – April 8, 2001) was an American singer-songwriter. He scored three US Billboard Hot 100 hits in the 1980s as a solo artist, and later became tenor vocalist in the country music band BlackHawk in the 1990s. In addition, Van co-wrote several singles for other artists, such as Restless Heart. Stephenson died of melanoma in 2001.

Biography
Stephenson was born in Hamilton, Ohio, but moved to Nashville, Tennessee, when he was ten years old, and he played in garage bands as a teenager. He graduated from seminary school and wrote songs on the side in the 1970s; his first chart hit as a songwriter was for Crystal Gayle, who cracked the US country Top Ten with his "Your Kisses Will" in 1979. Stephenson went on to write hits for Kenny Rogers, Dan Seals, Janie Fricke, and John Anderson. Partnering with Dave Robbins, Stephenson wrote a string of hits for Restless Heart and would continue to work with Robbins later in his career.

Stephenson landed a recording contract of his own with Handshake Records, through which he released his first solo album, China Girl, in 1981.  He later signed with MCA, and his second album, Righteous Anger, was released in 1984.  He scored big on the Billboard charts with "Modern Day Delilah" peaking at No. 22, and a second hit, "What the Big Girls Do", peaked at No. 45. Righteous Anger charted at No. 54 on the Billboard 200, but his follow-up 1986 disc, Suspicious Heart, did not chart, nor did its lead single, "We're Doing Alright." It also included two songs featured on movie soundtracks: "Make It Glamorous" from the 1984 film The Wild Life and "No Secrets" from the 1985 film Secret Admirer. Stephenson returned to songwriting duties until the early 1990s, when he became one-third of BlackHawk, a successful country group, through the end of the decade. In February 1999, Stephenson was diagnosed with melanoma and underwent surgery. He left the group in February 2000 to continue battling the cancer, but he died on the morning of April 8, 2001, as a result of the disease.

Discography

Studio albums

with BlackHawk
Blackhawk (1994)
Strong Enough (1995)
Love & Gravity (1997)
The Sky's the Limit (1998)

Singles

Soundtrack appearances
 "Make It Glamorous" (from The Wild Life) (1984)
 "All American Boy" (from The Slugger's Wife) (1985)
 "No Secrets", "You've Been Lied to Before" (from Secret Admirer) (1985)

References

External links
 

1953 births
2001 deaths
American country singer-songwriters
Singer-songwriters from Ohio
People from Hamilton, Ohio
Blackhawk (band) members
Deaths from cancer in Tennessee
Deaths from melanoma
20th-century American singers
Country musicians from Ohio